Mohammad Masood Azhar Alvi is a radical Islamist and terrorist, being the founder and leader of the Pakistan-based terrorist organisation Jaish-e-Mohammed, active mainly in the Pakistani-administered portion of the Kashmir region. His actions are not limited to the South Asian region; for instance, BBC News described him as "the man who brought jihad to Britain." On 1 May 2019, Masood Azhar was listed as an international terrorist by the United Nations Security Council.

Early life
Azhar was born in Bahawalpur, Punjab, Pakistan on 10 July 1968 (although some sources list his birth date as 7 August 1968) as the third of 11 children—five sons and six daughters. Azhar's father, Allah Bakhsh Shabbir, was the headmaster at a government-run school as well as a cleric with Deobandi leanings and his family operated a dairy and poultry farm.

Azhar dropped out of mainstream school after class 8 and joined the Jamia Uloom Islamic school, from where he graduated out in 1989 as an alim and was soon appointed as a teacher. The  madrasa was heavily involved with Harkat-ul-Ansar and Azhar was subsequently assumed under its folds, after being enrolled for a jihad training camp at Afghanistan. Despite failing to complete the course; he joined the Soviet–Afghan War and retired after suffering injuries. Thereafter, he was chosen as the head of Harkat's department of motivation. He was also entrusted with the editorial responsibilities for the Urdu-language magazine Sad’e Mujahidin and the Arabic-language Sawte Kashmir.

Azhar later became the general secretary of Harkat-ul-Ansar and visited many international locations to recruit, to raise funds and to spread the message of Pan-Islamism.  Among his destinations were Zambia, Abu Dhabi, Saudi Arabia, Mongolia, the United Kingdom and Albania.

Activities in Somalia
Azhar confessed that in 1993 he traveled to Nairobi, Kenya to meet with leaders of al-Itihaad al-Islamiya, an al-Qaeda-aligned Somali group, who had requested money and recruits from Harkat-ul-Mujahideen (HuM). Indian intelligence officials believe that he made at least three trips to Somalia and that he also helped bring Yemeni mercenaries to Somalia.

Activities in the United Kingdom
In August 1993 Azhar entered the United Kingdom for a speaking, fundraising, and recruitment tour. His message of jihad was given at some of Britain's most prestigious Islamic institutions including the Darul Uloom Bury seminary, Zakariya Mosque, Madina Masjid in Blackburn and Burnley, and Jamia Masjid. His message was that "substantial proportion of the Koran had been devoted to 'killing for the sake of Allah' and that a substantial volume of sayings of the Islamic prophet Muhammad were on the issue of jihad." Azhar made contacts in Britain who helped to provide training and logistical support the terror plots including "7/7, 21/7 and the attempt in 2006 to smuggle liquid bomb-making substances on to transatlantic airlines."

Harkat-ul-Ansar
In 1993, the militant organisation Harkat-ul-Ansar was established and Masood served as its general secretary. In 1998, U.S.'s Central Intelligence Agency (CIA) in its report stated, "HuA, an Islamic extremist organisation that Pakistan supports in its proxy war against Indian forces in Kashmir, increasingly is using terrorist tactics against Westerners and random attacks on civilians that could involve Westerners to promote its pan-Islamic agenda." CIA also stated that Hua had abducted at least 13 persons of which 12 were from western countries in the period from early 1994 to 1998.

Arrest in India
In early 1994, Azhar travelled to Srinagar under a fake identity, to ease tensions between Harkat-ul-Ansar's feuding factions of Harkat-ul-Jihad al-Islami and Harkat-ul-Mujahideen. India arrested him in February from Khanabal near Anantnag and imprisoned him for his terrorist activities with the groups. On being arrested, he said "Soldiers of Islam have come from 12 countries to liberate Kashmir. We will answer your carbines with rocket launchers"  He was imprisoned at the Badami Bagh Cantonment in Srinagar, Tihar Jail in Delhi, and lastly the Kot Balwal Jail in Jammu (from where he would eventually be released).

In July, 1995, six foreign tourists were kidnapped in Jammu and Kashmir. The kidnappers, referring to themselves as Al-Faran (a pseudonym of the Harkat-ul-Mujahideen), included the release of Masood Azhar among their demands. One of the hostages managed to escape whilst another was found in a decapitated state in August. The others were never seen or heard from since 1995. FBI had interrogated Azhar multiple times during his jail-stay on the locus of the kidnappings.

Release after hijacking
Four years later, in December 1999, an Indian Airlines Flight 814 (IC814) en route from Kathmandu in Nepal to New Delhi was hijacked and eventually landed in Kandahar, Afghanistan after being flown to multiple locations. Kandahar at that time was controlled by the Taliban, which was supported by Pakistan's ISI. Masood Azhar was one of the three militants demanded to be released in exchange for freeing the hostages. Subsequently, Azhar was freed by the Indian government in a decision criticised by many including Ajit Doval as a "diplomatic failure", and that no one worth any consequence was contacted either by the (then) foreign minister (Jaswant Singh) or the (then) foreign secretary (Lalit Mansingh), and as a consequence, the Indian ambassador could not even get inside the Abu Dhabi airport. The hijackers of IC814 were led by Masood Azhar's brother, Ibrahim Athar. His release from Kot Bhalwal jail was supervised by an IPS officer, S P Vaid. His younger brother Abdul Rauf Asghar had planned this attack. Once Masood Azhar was handed over to the hijackers, they fled to Pakistani territory. Pakistan had said the hijackers would be arrested if found. The Pakistani government also previously indicated that Azhar would be allowed to return home since he did not face any charges there.

Shortly after his release, Azhar made a public address to an estimated 10,000 people in Karachi. He proclaimed, "I have come here because this is my duty to tell you that Muslims should not rest in peace until we have destroyed India," vowing to liberate the Kashmir region from Indian rule.

In 1999, after Masood's release, the Harkat-ul-Ansar was proscribed by the U.S. and added to the list of banned terrorist organisations. This move forced Harkat-ul-Ansar to change its name to the Harkat-ul-Mujahideen (HuM).

Jaish-e-Mohammed
Azhar planned to start a new outfit named as, Jaish-e-Mohammed (JeM). He reportedly received assistance from Pakistan's spy agency Inter-Services Intelligence (ISI), the Taliban regime in Afghanistan, Osama bin Laden and multiple Sunni sectarian organisations based in Pakistan. JeM is run by Azhar's family like a family enterprise. Jamia Binoria madarsa linked JeM with the Afghan Taliban.

2001 Indian Parliament attack
Jaish-e-Mohammed carried out a string of deadly attacks against Indian targets, including the attack on the Indian parliament in December 2001 that brought India and Pakistan to the brink of a full-scale war. The terrorist attack on the Parliament of India in New Delhi happened on 13 December 2001. The perpetrators belonged to Lashkar-e-Taiba (LeT) and Jaish-e-Mohammed (JeM), both Pakistan-based terrorist organisations. The attack led to the deaths of five terrorists, six Delhi Police personnel, two Parliament Security Service personnel and a gardenerin total 14and to increased tensions between India and Pakistan, resulting in the 2001–02 India–Pakistan standoff.

Soon after the Indian parliament attack, on 29 December 2001, Masood Azhar was detained for a year by Pakistani authorities, after diplomatic pressure by India and International community, in connection with the attack but was never formally charged. The Lahore High Court ordered an end to the house arrest on 14 December 2002, much to the fury of India. Azhar was never arrested after that.

2008 Mumbai attacks

On 7 December 2008, it was claimed that he was among several arrested by the Pakistani government after a military raid on a camp located on the outskirts of Muzaffarabad in connection with the 2008 Mumbai attacks. He continued to live in Bhawalpur.  Pakistan's government denied it had arrested Masood Azhar and said it was unaware of his whereabouts 
On 26 January 2014, Azhar reappeared after a seclusion of two years. He addressed a rally in Muzaffarabad, calling for the resumption of jihad in Kashmir. In March 2014, a spokesperson of Jaish-e-Muhammad claimed that he was in Srinagar, India.

2016 Pathankot attack

The 2016 Pathankot attack on Indian air base is said to be masterminded by Masood Azhar and his brother. They were in direct touch with terrorists even after the attack had begun. Indian investigative agencies have given dossiers containing proofs of Azhar's complicity in the terror attack and also sought a second ʽred corner noticeʼ from ʽInterpolʼ.

2019 Pulwama attack

On 14 February 2019, a convoy of vehicles carrying security personnel on the Jammu Srinagar National Highway was attacked by a vehicle-bound suicide bomber in Lethpora near Awantipora, Pulwama district, Jammu and Kashmir, India. The attack resulted in the death of 44 Central Reserve Police Force (CRPF) personnel and the attacker. The responsibility for the attack was claimed by the Pakistan-based Islamist terrorist group Jaish-e-Mohammed. He approved the attacks from the Pakistani Army Hospital where he is under protective custody. After the attack, France, United Kingdom and United States  moved a proposal at UN Security Council to ban Masood.

Sanctions
The U.S. Treasury is prohibiting Americans from "engaging in any transactions" with three Pakistan-based militants and a front group. Al Rehmat Trust, called "an operational front" for Jaish-e Mohammed, was designated for providing support to and for acting for or on behalf of that group, and Mohammed Masood Azhar Alvi, Jaish-e Mohammed's founder and leader, was designated as a Specially Designated Global Terrorist on the Specially Designated Nationals and Blocked Persons List for acting on behalf of the group.

The Chinese government blocked a UN Security Council Sanctions Committee listing of Azhar as a terrorist, thwarting international efforts to disrupt the activities of his group.
Starting 2009, there have been 4 attempts to put Masood Azhar in the UN Security Council's counter-terrorism sanctions list. All the attempts were vetoed by China, citing 'lack of evidence'. China moved to protect Azhar again in October 2016 when it blocked India's appeal to the United Nations to label him as a terrorist.
China also blocked US move to get Azhar banned by UN in February 2017. The most recent attempt was on 13 March 2019. However, China pulled the blockade in May 2019, finally resulting listing of Masood Azhar as a global terrorist by the Al-Qaida and Taliban Sanctions Committee.

Bibliography

Books and booklets by him
Described as a "prolific writer", he has authored some 20 books mainly on jihad, including:
Fatah-ul-Jawad, described by scholar Ayesha Siddiqa as "his seminal work", it is a book on jihad "with two volumes of 2,000 pages each."
Faz̤āʼil-i jihād, kāmil. On the importance of Jihad; a 850-page commentary on Mashāriʻal-Ashwāq ilʹa-Maṣariʻ al-ʻUshshāq by the medieval scholar Ibn an-Naḥās. In 2002 it was estimated that some 20,000 copies of this book have been sold in Pakistan.
Yahūd kī cālīs bīmāryān̲ ("Forty Diseases Of The Jews"). Middle East Media Research Institute noted that it may be one of the most antisemitic book of the Urdu language, with 424 pages and 440 Qur'anic verses quoted. He has criticized the whole of Judaism, calling it "another name for those beliefs, ideas, and practices which were invented by Satan."
Muskurāte zak̲h̲m. Political autobiography.
K̲h̲ut̤bāt-i jihād. Islamic sermons in two volumes on the eminence of Jihad according to the teachings of Islam. 
Rang o nūr. Collected columns chiefly on jihad and criticizing Pakistani government for following United States policies.
Jamāl-i Jamīl. On the life of Muḥammd Jamīl K̲h̲ān, 1953-2004, a noted religious scholar.
Zād-i mujāhid : maʻ maktūbāt-i k̲h̲ādim. On the eminence, views and interpretation of Jihad.
7 din raushnī ke jazīre par. 7 Days comprehensive course on Islamic teaching.
Tuḥfah-yi saʻādat. Study of God's names in the Qur'an.

Books and booklets about him
Maulānā Masʻūd Aẓhar, mujāhid yā dahshatgard by Muḥammad T̤āriq Maḥmūd Cug̲h̲tāʼī.
Asīr-i Hind : Maulānā Masʻūd Aẓhar ke paidāʼish parvarish jihād men̲ shirkat by ʻAbdullāh Masʻūd.

See also
Abdul Rauf Asghar
Mohammed Omar
Osama Bin Laden
Kandahar Hijacking
List of fugitives from justice who disappeared

References

External links
BBC Profile (includes photos)
History Commons profile
Global Security profile 
China's move to block ban against Azhar came just before deadline

1968 births
Fugitives wanted by India
Fugitives wanted on terrorism charges
Leaders of Islamic terror groups
Living people
People from Bahawalpur
Deobandis
Critics of Judaism
People designated by the Al-Qaida and Taliban Sanctions Committee
Pakistani people imprisoned abroad
Pakistani people imprisoned on charges of terrorism
Pakistani expatriates in India
Specially Designated Nationals and Blocked Persons List
Individuals designated as terrorists by the United States government
Pakistani Islamists